William Carl Bunting (born August 26, 1947) is an American former basketball player.

Born in New Bern, North Carolina, he played collegiately for the University of North Carolina.

He was selected by the New York Knicks in the second round (26th pick overall) of the 1969 NBA draft and by the Miami Floridians in the 1969 ABA Draft.

He played for the Carolina Cougars (1969–70), New York Nets (1970) and Virginia Squires (1970–72) in the American Basketball Association for 145 games.

References

External links

1947 births
Living people
American men's basketball players
Basketball players from North Carolina
Carolina Cougars players
Miami Floridians draft picks
North Carolina Tar Heels men's basketball players
New York Knicks draft picks
New York Nets players
Small forwards
Sportspeople from New Bern, North Carolina
Virginia Squires players